Andrew Houston (born November 7, 1970) is an American stock car racing spotter and former driver. He is a veteran of the NASCAR Craftsman Truck Series, scoring three wins.

Houston is the son of legendary Busch driver Tommy Houston and the youngest of three brothers, one of them being part-time NASCAR driver Marty Houston and the other being the oldest of the three, Scott Houston. He is also the cousin of former team owner Teresa Earnhardt. Houston has also raced in the Winston Cup Series and the Busch Series. Houston is married to wife Lorie and has two children, Collin (born in 1997) and Clark (born in 2001).

Early racing career
Houston won Hickory Motor Speedway's Late Model Championship in 1994, and, in 1996, he won the Goody's Dash Series Most Popular Driver Award.

NASCAR career

Cup Series
2000 marked Houston's first start in the Winston Cup Series as he competed in five races to prepare for his 2001 rookie campaign with PPI Motorsports. Out of the five races his best finish would come at Lowe's Motor Speedway, a 26th. Houston began the year 2001 well with a ninth-place qualifying effort at the Daytona 500 in the No. 96 McDonald's-sponsored Ford. It would be one of the highlights of the year, as Houston ended the year with no top 10's and a best finish of 17th at Martinsville; Houston only managed to qualify for 17 races and his team folded after McDonald's pulled its sponsorship late in the season. He has not returned to the Cup Series since.

Busch Series
Houston made his Busch Series debut in 1996 driving the No. 0 Suburban Propane Ford at Indianapolis Raceway Park. He would start the race in the 21st position and finish in the 24th position, five laps down. He returned to the series in 1998 to make another start this time at Hickory Motor Speedway in the No. 50 Dr Pepper Ford. He would start the race in 7th and finish in the 20th position. In 2000, Houston made one start for Team SABCO and brought the No. 82 Channellock Chevrolet home in the 36th position at the Milwaukee Mile. For the 2002 season, Houston was supposed to run the whole season with the Herzog-Jackson Motorsports team, but was replaced by Todd Bodine after 3 races. His best finish with the team was a 9th at Daytona.

Truck Series
In 1997, Houston made his first Craftsman Truck Series start with Addington Racing. He would compete in four races for the team with a best finish of 11th at Martinsville. For the 1998 season, he returned to Addington Racing and ran full-time in the Truck Series. Houston would have a solid year winning his first race at New Hampshire International Speedway and posting 9 top tens, while finishing 12th in points. Houston again returned to Addington Racing for the 1999 season and he scored 14 top tens with an 8th-place finish in points. 2000 was a breakout year for Houston, as he won two races at Homestead and Portland, had 13 top fives, and 18 top tens, finishing 3rd in points to Roush Racing teammates Greg Biffle and Kurt Busch. He returned to the series in 2002 with Melling Racing where he ran one race at South Boston Speedway. After that Billy Ballew Motorsports hired him to run the remainder of 2002. He would post a best finish of 12th at California out of the five races he competed in. In 2003, Houston was still running races for Billy Ballew and Nelly when Vokal became his primary sponsor, until Billy ran out of money to run two trucks. Ballew kept Rich Bickle, leaving Houston without a ride. Later that year, Ultra Motorsports gave him a truck ride and he did very well, finishing no worse than tenth and earned a pole at Texas Motor Speedway. For the 2004 season, he continued driving for Ultra Motorsports until he was released after the race at Bristol. Andy's best finish with the team that year was a 7th at Dover. For the remainder of 2004 with the exception of Richmond, Houston raced with multiple teams, but with limited success. In 2005, he only ran one race with Key Motorsports at Bristol Motor Speedway, finishing 33rd after a crash in his final NASCAR race.

Post-racing career
Following his racing career, Houston worked as a spotter for other drivers; he worked with Richard Childress Racing, spotting for Austin Dillon in the Nationwide Series in the early 2010s, moving up with Dillon to the Sprint Cup Series in 2014. He left Dillon's team after the 2019 season. He announced in November 2019 on Twitter that he would spot for Cole Custer for the 2020 season in Custer's rookie campaign.

Motorsports career results

NASCAR
(key) (Bold – Pole position awarded by qualifying time. Italics – Pole position earned by points standings or practice time. * – Most laps led.)

Winston Cup Series

Daytona 500

Busch Series

Craftsman Truck Series

Winston West Series

References

External links
 

Living people
1970 births
People from Hickory, North Carolina
Racing drivers from North Carolina
NASCAR drivers
ISCARS Dash Touring Series drivers
Herzog Motorsports drivers